Anthropodermic bibliopegy is the practice of binding books in human skin. , The Anthropodermic Book Project has examined 31 out of 50 books in public institutions supposed to have anthropodermic bindings, of which 18 have been confirmed as human and 13 have been demonstrated to be animal leather instead.

Terminology 
'Bibliopegy' is a rare synonym for 'bookbinding'.

The phrase "anthropodermic bibliopegy" has been used at least since Lawrence S. Thompson's article on the subject, published in 1946.

History 

An early reference to a book bound in human skin is found in the travels of Zacharias Conrad von Uffenbach. Writing about his visit to Bremen in 1710: 

During the French Revolution, there were rumours that a tannery for human skin had been established at Meudon outside Paris. The Carnavalet Museum owns a volume containing the French Constitution of 1793 and Declaration of the Rights of Man and of the Citizen described as 'passing for being made in human skin imitating calf'.

The majority of well-attested anthropodermic bindings date from the 19th century.

Examples

Criminals
Surviving examples of human skin bindings have often been commissioned, performed, or collected by medical doctors, who have access to cadavers, sometimes those of executed criminals, such as the case of John Horwood in 1821 and William Corder in 1828. The Royal College of Surgeons of Edinburgh preserves a notebook bound in the skin of the murderer William Burke after his execution and subsequent public dissection by Professor Alexander Monro in 1829. (Note that Horwood, Corder, and Burke were all hanged and not flayed.)

What Lawrence Thompson called "the most famous of all anthropodermic bindings" is exhibited at the Boston Athenaeum, titled The Highwayman: Narrative of the Life of James Allen alias George Walton. It is by James Allen, who made his deathbed confession in prison in 1837 and asked for a copy bound in his own skin to be presented to a man he once tried to rob and admired for his bravery, and another one for his doctor. Once he died, a piece of his back was taken to a tannery and utilized for the book.

Dance of Death
An exhibition of fine bindings at the Grolier Club in 1903 included, in a section of 'Bindings in Curious Materials', three editions of Holbein's 'Dance of Death' in 19th-century human skin bindings; two of these now belong to the John Hay Library at Brown University. Other examples of the Dance of Death include an 1856 edition offered at auction by Leonard Smithers in 1895 and an 1842 edition from the personal library of Florin Abelès was offered at auction by Piasa of Paris in 2006. Bookbinder Edward Hertzberg describes the Monastery Hill Bindery having been approached by "[a]n Army Surgeon ... with a copy of Holbein's Dance of Death with the request that we bind it in a piece of human skin, which he brought along."

Other examples
Another tradition, with less supporting evidence, is that books of erotica have been bound in human skin.

A female admirer of the French astronomer Camille Flammarion supposedly bequeathed her skin to bind one of his books. At Flammarion's observatory, there is a copy of his  on which is stamped  ("human skin binding, 1880").

The Newberry Library in Chicago owns an Arabic manuscript written in 1848, with a handwritten note that it is bound in human skin, though "it is the opinion of the conservation staff that the binding material is not human skin, but rather highly burnished goat". This book is mentioned in the novel The Time Traveler's Wife, much of which is set in the Newberry.

The National Library of Australia holds a 19th-century poetry book with the inscription "Bound in human skin" on the first page. The binding was performed 'before 1890' and identified as human skin by pathologists in 1992.

A portion of the binding in the copy of Dale Carnegie's Lincoln the Unknown that is part of Temple University's Charles L. Blockson Collection was "taken from the skin of a Negro at a Baltimore Hospital and tanned by the Jewell Belting Company".

Identification 
The identification of human skin bindings has been attempted by examining the pattern of hair follicles, to distinguish human skin from that of other animals typically used for bookbinding, such as calf, sheep, goat, and pig. This is a necessarily subjective test, made harder by the distortions in the process of treating leather for binding. Testing a DNA sample is possible in principle, but DNA can be destroyed when skin is tanned, degrades over time, and can be contaminated by human readers.

Instead, peptide mass fingerprinting (PMF) and matrix-assisted laser desorption/ionization (MALDI) have recently been used to identify the material of bookbindings. A tiny sample is extracted from the book's covering and the collagen analysed by mass spectrometry to identify the variety of proteins which are characteristic of different species. PMF can identify skin as belonging to a primate; since monkeys were almost never used as a source of skin for bindings, this implies human skin.

The Historical Medical Library of the College of Physicians of Philadelphia owns five anthropodermic books, confirmed by peptide mass fingerprinting in 2015, of which three were bound from the skin of one woman. This makes it the largest collection of such books in one institution. The books can be seen in the associated Mütter Museum.

The John Hay Library at Brown University owns four anthropodermic books, also confirmed by PMF: Vesalius's De Humani Corporis Fabrica, two nineteenth-century editions of Holbein's Dance of Death, and Mademoiselle Giraud, My Wife (1891).

Three books in the libraries of Harvard University have been reputed to be bound in human skin, but peptide mass fingerprinting has confirmed only one,  by Arsène Houssaye, held in the Houghton Library. (The other two books at Harvard were determined to be bound in sheepskin, the first being Ovid's Metamorphoses, held in the Countway Library, the second being a treatise on Spanish law, held in the library of Harvard Law School.)

The Harvard skin book belonged to Dr Ludovic Bouland of Strasbourg (died 1932), who rebound a second, now in the Wellcome Library in London. The Wellcome also owns a notebook labelled as bound in the skin of 'the Negro whose Execution caused the War of Independence', presumably Crispus Attucks, but the library doubts that it is actually human skin.

Confirmed examples

Supposed examples confirmed as animal skin

Unconfirmed but located examples

Ethical and legal issues 

 Repatriation and reburial of human remains
 Human trophy collecting
 Human Tissue Act 2004 (United Kingdom)
 Paul Needham, A Binding of Human Skin in the Houghton Library: A Recommendation (25 June 2014)

In popular culture 

The binding of books in human skin is also a common element within horror films and works of fiction.

Fiction
 In H.P. Lovecraft's horror story "The Hound" (1922), the narrator and his friend St John, who are graverobbers, have a collection of macabre artefacts. Amongst them, "A locked portfolio, bound in tanned human skin, held certain unknown and unnameable drawings which it was rumoured Goya had perpetrated but dared not acknowledge."
 In David H. Keller's short story "Binding Deluxe", first published in Marvel Tales (May 1934), a bookbinder uses the skins of the men she murders to create a "deluxe" binding for a set of Encyclopædia Britannica.
 In Brian Lumley's story 'Billy's Oak' (1970), a book, the Cthaat Aquadingen, is bound in human skin. Although over 400 years old, it still sweats.
 P. C. Hodgell's Kencyr series (1982 onwards) features "the Book Bound in Pale Leather", which appears to be bound in living human skin.
 Chuck Palahniuk's novel Lullaby (2002) features a book bound in human skin called "The Grimoire".
 In the novel The Journal of Dora Damage (2008) by Belinda Starling, a bookbinder is brought "leather" by a client with which to undertake a "special binding" of this nature.
 In Linda Fairstein's mystery novel Lethal Legacy (2009), a book collector shows investigators an 1828 book of trial proceedings that is bound with the skin of a convicted murderer.
 In the novel The Eye of God (2013) by James Rollins, Vigor receives a package from Father Josip Tarasco that contains a skull and an ancient book bound in human skin.
 In The Book of Life (2014) by Deborah Harkness (the final book in the A Discovery of Witches trilogy) the book is made entirely of human / creature materials including the binding, ink, and paper.
 In Trudi Canavan's novel Thief's Magic, a protagonist discovers a magical book made by a powerful sorcerer with skin, hair, bones and tendons from a talented bookbinder
 In I Am Providence (2016) by Nick Mamatas, a book bound in human skin, whose owner is murdered, propels the plot.
 In Cliff Biggers's short story Igawesdi, a scholar of forbidden books is offered the opportunity to examine pages from a compendium on the subject, bound in human skin, and finds it to be different than he expected.

Television and cinema
 In the Evil Dead series of films and comic books originally created by Sam Raimi in 1981, a fictional Sumerian book called the Necronomicon Ex-Mortis is bound in human skin and inked with human blood.
 In the Disney film Hocus Pocus (1993), the eldest Sanderson sister's (played by Bette Midler) fictional spellbook is bound in a patchwork of human skin with an enchanted, moving human eye embedded in the cover.
 Peter Greenaway's 1996 film The Pillow Book contains a sequence in which the body of a writer's lover is exhumed by an obsessed publisher; and his skin, which she wrote upon after his death, is painstakingly tanned and bound into a book.
 The eponymous book in the Canadian television series Todd and the Book of Pure Evil (2010) is allegedly bound in human skin.
 In the episode "Like a Virgin" (2011) of the TV series Supernatural, the book containing the spell to release the Mother of All is printed (rather than bound) on human skin.
 In one episode of Truth Seekers (2020), a prologue scene depicts a sequence where a publisher is killed over the possession of pages of "Praecepta Mortuorum", a book written on sun-dried human skin.

Video games
 In the video game Shadow Hearts (2001), one of the characters is able to use a book bound from human skin as a weapon.
 The video game Eternal Darkness: Sanity's Requiem (2002) centers around a book called the "Tome of Eternal Darkness" which is bound in human flesh.
 The video game "Assassin's Creed Unity" (2014) features the practice of binding books in human skins in a mission set in 18th century Franciade.
 In The Elder Scrolls, The Oghma Infinitum is a artifact of the deity known as "Herma-Mora", It is a book bound in human skin.

Notes

References

Further reading
 The Anthropodermic Book Project
 Jim Chevallier, 'Human Skin: Books (In and On)', Sundries: An Eighteenth Century Newsletter, #26 (April 15, 2006)
 Anita Dalton, Anthropodermic Bibliopegy: A Flay on Words, Odd Things Considered, 9 November 2015
 
 
  (discusses John Stockton Hough's books)
 
 
  – also available on academia.edu
 .
 .
 .
 
 
 
 
  (originally issued separately in 1949 as University of Kentucky Libraries Occasional Contributions no. 6)

To use with caution
  (Read with caution: This work is mostly obsolete. See the Table Supposed examples confirmed as animal skin.)

External links

Bookbinding
Human trophy collecting
Leather
Human skin